Hulsig Church is a church located in the village of Hulsig,  south of Skagen in the far north of Jutland, Denmark.

History and description
The little church which stands alone in the sand dunes close to the main road was completed in 1894. Designed by Vilhelm Ahlmann in the Neo-Romanesque style, the red-brick building consists of a triangular chancel and a nave. At the west end, there is a small bell tower with a spire. The painting on the altarpiece is a copy of Joakim Skovgaard's Hyrden finder det bortløbne lam (The Shepherd finds the Lost Sheep). The organ from 1972 was designed by Peter Bruhn.

References

External links

Buildings and structures in Frederikshavn Municipality
Buildings and structures in Skagen
Churches completed in 1894
Churches in the diocese of Aalborg
Churches in the North Jutland Region
Romanesque Revival church buildings in Denmark